Parliamentary elections were held in Chad on 31 May 1959. The result was a victory for the Chadian Progressive Party, which won 57 of the 85 seats in the enlarged National Assembly.

Results

References

Chad
1959 in Chad
Elections in Chad
May 1959 events in Africa